The Ashland Daily Press (or simply Daily Press) is a twice-weekly newspaper based in Ashland, Wisconsin.  American Consolidated Media(ACM) bought the paper in 2007; in 2014, Adams Publishing Group (APG) acquired 34 papers, including the Daily Press, from ACM. It is primarily distributed in Ashland, Bayfield, Douglas, Iron, Price and Sawyer counties. In 2015, APG acquired three shoppers based in Ashland: the Evergreen Country Shopper, North Country Sun and Evergreen Zone 2.

History 
The Daily Press was founded in 1888.

References

External links 
 

Newspapers published in Wisconsin
Ashland, Wisconsin